Kassis is a surname. Notable people with the surname include:

Kyriakos D. Kassis (born 1946), Greek poet and painter
Nabeel Kassis (born 1945), Palestinian academic and politician
Nick Kassis (born 1988), Lebanese rugby league footballer
Randa Kassis (born 1970), Franco-Syrian politician